Alma Gertrude Vansittart Harrison (1853–1939) was a British translator and poet known for her translations of folk songs, folk tales, and poems from Greek, Romanian, French, Provençal, German, Norwegian, and other languages.

Family

Alma Gertrude Vansittart Strettell was the daughter of Laura Vansittart (Neale) Strettell and the Reverend Alfred Baker Strettell, the British consular chaplain in Genoa, Italy, and subsequently the rector of St. Martin’s Church in Canterbury. Her sister, Alice, became a costume designer.

In 1890, Strettell married Lawrence Alexander "Peter" Harrison (1866–1937), an English painter.  They had three children.  She is one of the figures shown at Ightham Mote in John Singer Sargent's 'A Game of Bowls' (1890).

Literary career
Strettell established a reputation as a translator with some forty translations that she contributed to the 1889 volume Selections from the Greek Anthology.  She is one of only five translators named on the title page. Over the subsequent decades of her career, critics complimented her on her "genius for felicitous paraphrases" from foreign languages and on her ability to make her translations sound as if they were originally written in English.

Two years later, she collaborated with Elisabeth of Wied, Queen consort of Romania, who published under the pen name Carmen Sylva. Together they translated the Romanian-French writer Elena Văcărescu's Romanian folk songs into English under the title The Bard of the Dimbovitza. The book proved popular and went through multiple reprints over the next decade, with selections being set to music by such composers as Charles Griffes, Arnold Bax, and Arthur Foote. They later (1896) collaborated on a second volume of translations, this time of folk tales.

In 1894, Strettell published Lullabies of Many Lands, which included translations from German, Norwegian, and Romanian.

In 1897, she published a book of translations of Spanish and Italian folk songs. It was illustrated by Edwin Austin Abbey and John Singer Sargent. Sargent, a close friend, painted Strettell's portrait twice, once around 1889 and again in 1905, and also included her in several group studies. She is among a group of figures in his 1889 painting A Game of Bowls, Ightham Mote, Kent.

In 1899, Strettell published Poems of Émile Verhaeren, with an expanded version in 1915 that stood as the major English translation of Verhaeren's work for the remainder of the century.  Another poet she translated was Frédéric Mistral; her versions were issued in tandem with the 1907 English translation of his memoirs edited by Constance Maud. Other poets she translated included Paul Verlaine and Charles Baudelaire.

Strettell also published some of her own poetry in The Yellow Book and The Fortnightly Review.

Publications
Translations
Spanish and Italian Folk-Songs (1887)
Selections from the Greek Anthology (1889, edited by Rosamund Marriott Watson; some 40 translations)
The Bard of the Dimbovitza (1891, 1894l, with Carmen Sylva)
Lullabies of Many Lands (1894, 1896)
Legends from River & Mountain (1896, with Carmen Sylva)
Poems of Émile Verhaeren (1899)
Memoirs of Mistral (1907, edited by Constance Maud, with translations from the Provençal)
The Wreckers (les naufrageurs) (1909, with Ethel Smyth)

Articles
"A Little Western Town" (1881, Macmillan's Magazine)
"An Indian Festival" (1882, Macmillan's Magazine)

Extract
Beware of black old cats, with evil faces;
Yet more, of kittens white and soft be wary:
My sweetheart was just such a little fairy,
And yet she well-nigh scratched my heart to pieces.
—Alice Strettell, from her translation of Heinrich Heine's poem "Hüt Dich, mein Freund, vor grimmen Teufelsfratsen"

References

External links
 
Poems of Émile Verhaeren (1899) - Alma Strettell's translation at Project Gutenberg
 

1853 births
1939 deaths
19th-century British poets
20th-century British poets
19th-century British translators